Jamal Abdullah Al-Saffar (born 24 October 1971) is a Saudi Arabian sprinter who specialized in the 100 metres. His personal best time was 10.19 seconds, achieved in April 2002 in Al-Kuwait.

Achievements

References

1971 births
Living people
Saudi Arabian male sprinters
Athletes (track and field) at the 2000 Summer Olympics
Olympic athletes of Saudi Arabia
Asian Games medalists in athletics (track and field)
Athletes (track and field) at the 2002 Asian Games
Asian Games gold medalists for Saudi Arabia
Medalists at the 2002 Asian Games
20th-century Saudi Arabian people
21st-century Saudi Arabian people